Knotfest is a music festival created in 2012 by American heavy metal band Slipknot. The event has been held both as a touring festival and a destination festival in several countries including the United States, Canada, Japan, Germany, Mexico, Colombia, France and Chile.  Aside from Slipknot, Knotfest has featured a diverse alumni of past performers including Deftones, Marilyn Manson, Lamb of God, Bring Me the Horizon, Prong, Deadly Apples, In This Moment,  Amen, Butcher Babies and Prayers.

History

Creation
Knotfest was officially announced on June 4, 2012. Among the activities the festival offered as part of its "dark carnival experience" were circus big-top tents, pillars of fire, amusement park rides, burlesque performers, firebreathers, stilt walkers, drum circles made of junkyard cars and graffiti walls. The two shows also debuted a Slipknot museum.

"It's all about having fun and going crazy, bringing it to the standard it used to be," Slipknot's Shawn "Clown" Crahan told Rolling Stone. "It's time for us to really engulf this idea known as Knotfest where we're in control, we make a day devoted to our mindset, our ideas, the people that we want to play with, the people that we think our fans want to be around... When everyone leaves their senses [will be] overloaded, and I'm talking about smells, sights, hearing, your body, everything is overloaded with stimulation, because that's what Slipknot does."

The inaugural Knotfest was a two-city event and took place on August 17, 2012, in Council Bluffs, Iowa and August 18, 2012, in Somerset, Wisconsin. Among the line-up were bands such as Deftones, Lamb of God, and Cannibal Corpse. On March 24, 2014, it was officially announced that "Knotfest Japan" would be held in November 15 and 16 at Makuhari Messe, Tokyo. Headliners were Slipknot. Korn, Limp Bizkit, Lamb of God, Five Finger Death Punch, Papa Roach, Bring Me the Horizon, Trivium and In Flames. On the first date of the Mayhem Festival 2014, Knotfest 2014 was announced, with it being held at the San Manuel Amphitheater in San Bernardino, California, on October 24–26. Knotfest 2015 was to be held at the same location, from October 23 through 25. In December 2019, it was announced that Knotfest would be held in the United Kingdom for the first time in 2020.

Broadcast
On July 11, Slipknot announced that their closing performance at Knotfest would be broadcast via a pay-per-view streaming website. Shawn "Clown" Crahan said, "It means everything for everyone to see the live spectacle we're creating in the flesh, but we understand some fans around the world can't be at the show. We've now made it possible for you to be there in spirit - so join us live on August 18."

Performers

2012 line-up

2014 line-up

California

Japan

2015 line-up

California

Mexico

2016  line-up

"Ozzfest Meets Knotfest" California

Mexico

Japan

2017 line-up

Mexico

Ozzfest Meets Knotfest 2017

2018 line-up

Colombia

Mexico
Canceled due to lack of organization.

2019  line-up

Knotfest meets Hellfest 2019 France

Knotfest Roadshow 2019 USA & Canada

Knotfest meets Forcefest 2019 Mexico

Colombia

2021

Iowa

Knotfest Roadshow USA

Los Angeles

2022

Knotfest Roadshow USA & Canada
Jinjer was announced to appear in the first leg, but cancelled due to the ongoing Russian invasion of Ukraine, their homeland.

Germany

Finland

Knotfest Roadshow Argentina

Colombia

Chile

Brazil

2023

Australia

Japan

Italy

References

Heavy metal festivals in Mexico
Heavy metal festivals in the United States
Music festivals in Iowa
Music festivals in Wisconsin
Music festivals staged internationally
Slipknot (band)